Colonel Patrick Roddy VC (17 March 1827 – 21 November 1895) was an Irish recipient of the Victoria Cross, the highest and most prestigious award for gallantry in the face of the enemy that can be awarded to British and Commonwealth forces.

Details
He was 31 years old, and an ensign in the Bengal Army during the Indian Mutiny when the following deed took place for which he was awarded the VC.

Further information
He served in the Abyssinian War and the Second Anglo-Afghan War. He later achieved the rank of colonel. He died at Jersey, Channel Islands on 21 November 1895.

References

Listed in order of publication year 
The Register of the Victoria Cross (1981, 1988 and 1997)

Ireland's VCs  (Dept of Economic Development, 1995)
Monuments to Courage (David Harvey, 1999)
Irish Winners of the Victoria Cross (Richard Doherty & David Truesdale, 2000)

External links
Location of grave and VC medal (Jersey)

Irish recipients of the Victoria Cross
British Indian Army officers
British East India Company Army officers
People from County Roscommon
1827 births
1895 deaths
19th-century Irish people
Irish soldiers in the British East India Company Army
Indian Rebellion of 1857 recipients of the Victoria Cross
British military personnel of the Abyssinian War
British military personnel of the Second Anglo-Afghan War